Cedar Creek, a perennial stream of the Hunter River catchment, is located in the Hunter district of New South Wales, Australia.

Course

See also

 List of rivers of Australia
 List of rivers of New South Wales (A-K)
 Rivers of New South Wales

References

External links
 

 

Rivers of the Hunter Region